Students for Life of America (SFLA), also known as simply Students for Life (SFL), is a 501(c)(3) non-profit, pro-life organization that has formed groups of high school and college students across the country. Currently, there are over 2,000 SFL student groups across the nation. 

SFLA spokesperson Kristi Hamrick is cited as opposing prosecution of women who self-abort. Additionally, president Kristan Hawkins is on record as opposing exceptions for rape and incest when banning abortion.

History
SFLA was founded in 1988 as American Collegians for Life by students at Georgetown University. They run an event called "sockit2PP", targeting Planned Parenthood.

In the Fall Semester of 1976, prior to the inception of Students for Life, 77 California State University, Sacramento anti-abortion students formed United Students for Life. The faculty sponsor of the group was a Catholic Priest who was also a Criminal Justice Professor at that University, Father Edward MacKinnon. The group was about 50% Mormon with the remaining members of the group Catholics, Protestants and one self-described atheist. Existing from 1976 until 1980, they held numerous rallies, instigated a statewide initiative campaign, helped form other anti-abortion student groups, worked on the Morton Downey, Jr. Presidential Campaign, and hosted the January 22, 1980 California State Rally for Life  at the California State Capital.

In 2015, Boise State University paid SFLA $20,000 to settle a freedom of speech lawsuit.

References

External links
Official website

Anti-abortion organizations in the United States
Non-profit organizations based in Fredericksburg, Virginia
Youth organizations based in Virginia
Student political organizations in the United States
1988 establishments in Washington, D.C.
Political organizations established in 1988
501(c)(3) organizations